Howfield is a surname. Notable people with the surname include:

Bobby Howfield (born 1936), English footballer and American football player
Ian Howfield (born 1966), American football player, son of Bobby

English-language surnames